Hector Henry Hyslop (12 December 1840 – 11 September 1920) was an English cricketer. He was a right-handed batsman who played primarily as a wicket-keeper.

Hyslop made his first-class debut for Hampshire in 1876 against Derbyshire. He played eight first-class matches for Hampshire, his last match coming against Kent in 1877. In 1878 he played in several of the minor matches for the touring Australians. In September 1886 he played a first-class match for the touring Australians against an England XI at Harrogate; his inclusion in the Australia side came from the mistaken belief that Hyslop was born in Australia.

Hyslop worked for 36 years as a local government clerk in Camberwell, London. After several serious illnesses, he died at his home in Cosham, Hampshire, on 11 September 1920, having committed suicide by shooting himself. A bachelor, he left his property of more than 2,000 pounds to "a barmaid, the landlords of several inns, and other friends". One of the beneficiaries was the Australian cricketer Syd Gregory, who received 50 pounds.

References

External links

1840 births
1920 suicides
Cricketers from Southampton
English cricketers
Hampshire cricketers
Players of the South cricketers
Suicides by firearm in England
Wicket-keepers